Cristian Camilo Correa Valenzuela (born 27 August 1985) is a Colombian footballer who plays as a midfielder. He is currently a free agent.

Career
Correa's career got underway in 2004 with Atlético Nacional. He remained with the Categoría Primera A club for eight years, making a total of forty-eight appearances. During his time with Atlético Nacional, the midfielder was loaned out on four occasions. 2006 saw Correa play for Alianza Petrolera, which preceded a two year stint with Atlético Bello and a subsequent spell with Atlético La Sabana in 2010 - a total of forty appearances and four goals arrived for Correa with those teams. On 30 June 2011, Valledupar of Categoría Primera B signed Correa on loan. He remained for both the 2011 and 2012 seasons.

Correa left Atlético Nacional permanently in June 2012, as he agreed to sign for second tier Atlético Bucaramanga. He made his debut for them on 30 July 2012 against Deportivo Pereira, which was the first of forty-one fixtures he was selected in by the club across two campaigns. Correa joined Deportivo Pereira ahead of the 2014 Categoría Primera B season. He scored his first goal for them in his final appearance, netting during a win over América de Cali on 23 March 2015. Three months later, Correa moved to Unión Magdalena. Eight games and one goal, also against América de Cali, followed in 2015.

Career statistics
.

References

External links

1985 births
Living people
Sportspeople from Antioquia Department
Colombian footballers
Association football midfielders
Categoría Primera A players
Categoría Primera B players
Atlético Nacional footballers
Alianza Petrolera players
Atlético Bello footballers
Atlético La Sabana footballers
Valledupar F.C. footballers
Atlético Bucaramanga footballers
Deportivo Pereira footballers
Unión Magdalena footballers